Galmarini is an Italian surname. Notable people with the surname include:

 Anna Galmarini (1942–1997), Italian figure skater
 Malena Galmarini (born 1975), Argentine political scientist and politician
 Martín Galmarini (born 1982), Argentine footballer
 Nevin Galmarini (born 1986), Swiss snowboarder

Italian-language surnames